Herbert Burton (19 March 1888 – 24 March 1961) was a New Zealand cricketer. He played first-class cricket for Auckland and Wellington between 1909 and 1924.

See also
 List of Auckland representative cricketers

References

External links
 

1888 births
1961 deaths
New Zealand cricketers
Auckland cricketers
Wellington cricketers
People from Greenwich
Cricketers from Greater London